John Leonard (born 20 October 1976 in Dublin, Ireland) is a Gaelic footballer from Dublin.

As a child he played for Na Phiarsaigh in Baldoyle and later for St Sylvester's, where he remains. In his early 20s he was also called up and played for the Dublin junior football team, until it was suspended after a violent on-pitch brawl. He was previously the reserve goalkeeper for the Dublin senior football team. Leonard was on Dublin's winning team for the 2008 O'Byrne Cup winning team which defeated Longford in the final.

References

1976 births
Living people
Dublin Gaelic footballers 
Gaelic football goalkeepers
People from Malahide
Sportspeople from Fingal
St Sylvester's Gaelic footballers